Mansing Rongpi is a Bharatiya Janata Party politician from Assam. He was elected in Assam Legislative Assembly election in 2016 from Baithalangso as a candidate from the Indian National Congress party.

References

External links
 Mansing Rongpi at Assam Assembly

Living people
Bharatiya Janata Party politicians from Assam
Assam MLAs 2016–2021
People from West Karbi Anglong district
Indian National Congress politicians
Year of birth missing (living people)